Boris Misnik (30 July 1938 – 4 December 2021) was a Russian politician. A member of the Yabloko party, he served in the State Duma from 1995 to 2000.

References

1938 births
2021 deaths
Second convocation members of the State Duma (Russian Federation)
Yabloko politicians
People from Olenegorsk, Murmansk Oblast